Karl Paul Noonan (born February 17, 1944) is a former collegiate and professional football wide receiver.  As a high school football player at Assumption High School in Davenport (where one of his classmates was future Princeton All-American linebacker Stas Maliszewski). He played collegiately at the University of Iowa and professionally with the American Football League's Miami Dolphins from 1966 through 1969, and for the NFL's Dolphins from 1970 through 1972. 

Noonan had his one peak season with 1968, his third year. After combining for just 365 yards in eight combined starts the past two seasons, he caught 58 passes for 760 yards while having a league-leading eleven touchdowns. He was an AFL All-Star that season. In 1972 he separated his shoulder in the preseason recovering a bad snap while serving as the team's holder.  He was not activated even after recovering, although he assisted the coaching staff through Super Bowl VII from the press box analyzing the opposing defense.  He announced his retirement prior to the 1973 season.

See also
 List of American Football League players

References

1944 births
Living people
Sportspeople from Dubuque, Iowa
American football wide receivers
Miami Dolphins players
American Football League All-Star players
Iowa Hawkeyes football players
All-American college football players
American Football League players
Players of American football from Iowa